Ross Henry Trower (February 22, 1922 – October 31, 2014) was a rear admiral and Chief of Chaplains of the United States Navy.

Biography
Trower was born  in St. Louis, Missouri. He attended Carthage College (B.A., 1943), the Lutheran School of Theology at Chicago (M.Div., 1945) and Harvard Divinity School (S.T.M., 1954). On August 20, 1944, Trower married Margaret E. Doering, with whom he would have four children. He was ordained for the Illinois Synod of the Lutheran Church in America on February 21, 1945.

He died on October 31, 2014. Trower was interred with his wife Margaret (October 13, 1920 – August 2, 2001) at Arlington National Cemetery.

Career
Trower joined the United States Navy in 1945 and began training at Camp Perry. Afterwards, he was assigned to Naval Station Norfolk. Later, he tended to prisoners of war at Camp Allen.

After serving at Naval Station Great Lakes, Trower was deployed with the 1st Marine Division to serve in the Korean War. Afterwards, he was assigned to the 2nd Marine Division at Marine Corps Base Camp Lejeune.

During his time on the Canberra, Trower entertained Dwight D. Eisenhower during a trip to Bermuda. After being assigned to Naval Air Station North Island and returning for a time to Naval Station Great Lakes, Trower was deployed with the 1st Marine Aircraft Wing to serve in the Vietnam War in 1968. Later, he assisted returning prisoners of war.

After serving as Fleet Chaplain of the United States Pacific Fleet, Trower was Chief of Chaplains from 1979 until his retirement in 1983.

Awards he received during his career include the Navy Distinguished Service Medal.

References

1922 births
2014 deaths
Carthage College alumni
Lutheran School of Theology at Chicago alumni
20th-century American Lutheran clergy
United States Navy chaplains
Military personnel from St. Louis
United States Navy personnel of the Korean War
Harvard Divinity School alumni
United States Navy personnel of the Vietnam War
Chiefs of Chaplains of the United States Navy
Recipients of the Navy Distinguished Service Medal
People from Springfield, Virginia
Burials at Arlington National Cemetery